Mónica Patricia Regonesi Muranda (born April 27, 1961) is long-distance runner from Chile. She competed for her native country at the 1984 Summer Olympics in Los Angeles, California. There she ended up in 32nd place in the women's marathon. Regonesi set her personal best in the classic distance (2:40.28) in 1988. She also competed in the World Masters Athletics 2007 in Italy where she obtained first place in the marathon and 3rd place in the 10k.

Achievements

References
 sports-reference Mónica Regonesi

1961 births
Living people
Chilean female long-distance runners
Chilean people of Italian descent
Olympic athletes of Chile
Athletes (track and field) at the 1984 Summer Olympics
Pan American Games bronze medalists for Chile
Pan American Games medalists in athletics (track and field)
Athletes (track and field) at the 1983 Pan American Games
Athletes (track and field) at the 1987 Pan American Games
World Athletics Championships athletes for Chile
South American Games silver medalists for Chile
South American Games gold medalists for Chile
South American Games medalists in athletics
Competitors at the 1982 Southern Cross Games
Medalists at the 1983 Pan American Games
20th-century Chilean women